Paulo Machava (1954/5 – 28 August 2015) was a Mozambican journalist.

Life 
Machava started his career as a journalist at Mozambique's public radio Rádio Moçambique in the 1980s. He presented a radio show called Onda Matinal
("Morning Wave"), in which he talked about Maputo's organised crime. After Mozambique's democratisation and the introduction of the multi-party system Machava moved to Savana, a weekly newspaper known for being critical of the government, where he became editor-in-chief. In this position he investigated the scandal around the privatisation of the state-owned Banco Comercial de Moçambique.

Later he moved to the weekly newspaper Zambeze, but stayed only for a short time before moving to the publishing house of Ericino de Salema. There he founded the electronic newspaper Diário de Notícias and Embondeiro. Besides being a journalist, he also worked as a consultant for Maputo's gated community "Kaya Kwanga".

On the morning of 28 August 2015, Machava was on his way back to his home from his morning sports in the centre of Maputo at the corner Avenida Vladimir Lenine / Avenida Augustinho Neto, when he was shot four times by someone inside a passing car. Machava died at the scene.

References 

Assassinated Mozambican journalists
2015 deaths
Date of birth missing
Deaths by firearm in Mozambique
Year of birth uncertain